The Iroquoian peoples are an ethnolinguistic group of peoples from eastern North America. Their traditional territories, often referred to by scholars as Iroquoia, stretch from the mouth of the St. Lawrence River in the north, to modern-day North Carolina in the south.

Historical Iroquoian people were the Five nations of the Iroquois or Haudenosaunee, Huron or Wendat, Petun, Neutral or Attawandaron, Erie people, Wenro, Susquehannock and the St. Lawrence Iroquoians. 

The Cherokee are also an Iroquoian-speaking people.

There is archaeological evidence for Iroquoian peoples "in the area around present-day New York state by approximately 500 to 600 CE, and possibly as far back as 4000 BCE. Their distinctive culture seems to have developed by about 1000 CE.

List of Iroquoian peoples 

 Haudenosaunee of New York, Quebec and Ontario, Canada.
 Mohawk ( Kanienʼkehá:ka): of Quebec and Ontario, Canada, and New York, United States
 Seneca (Onödowáʼga): of New York and Oklahoma, United States and Ontario, Canada.
 Cayuga (Gayogo̱hó꞉nǫʼ): New York and Oklahoma, United States and Ontario, Canada.
 Oneida (Onʌyoteˀa·ká·): New York, Wisconsin, United States and Ontario, Canada.
 Tuscarora (Skarù:ręˀ): of New York, United States, and Ontario, Canada.
 Onondaga (Onöñda’gaga’): of New York, United States, and Ontario, Canada.
 Huron (Wendat): Georgian Bay, Ontario, Canada.
 Attignawantan
 Attigneenongnahac 
 Arendarhonon
 Tahontaenrat 
 Ataronchronon
 Petun (Tobacco or Tionontati): Georgian Bay, Ontario, Canada.
 Neutral Nation (Chonnonton or Attawandaron): southwestern and south-central Ontario.
 Erie (Eriechronon): of Upstate New York, Ohio, and Northwest Pennsylvania, United States.
 Susquehannock (Conestoga): of Pennsylvania, West Virginia, New York, and Maryland (United States).
 St. Lawrence Iroquoians: St. Lawrence River, Quebec, Canada, and New York, United States.
 Monongahela: Pennsylvania, West Virginia, and Ohio, United States.
 Scahentoarrhonon: Wyoming Valley, Pennsylvania.
 Nottoway (Cheroenhaka): of Virginia, United States.
 Senedo: Virginia, United States.
 Westo (Chichimeco or Richahecrian): of Virginia and South Carolina, United States.
 Wenrohronon (Wenro): New York, United States.
 Cherokee (Anigiduwagi): North Carolina, southeastern Tennessee, edges of western South Carolina, northern Georgia and northeastern Alabama.
 Meherrin (Kauwets'a:ka): North Carolina.

History 

Iroquois mythology tells that the Iroquoian people have their origin in a woman who fell from the sky, and that they have always been on Turtle Island.

Iroquoian societies were affected by the wave of infectious diseases resulting from the arrival of Europeans. For example, it is estimated that by the mid-17th century, the Huron population had decreased from 20,00030,000 to about 9000, while the Petun population dropped from around 8000 to 3000.

Archaeology 

The Hopewell tradition describes the common aspects of an ancient pre-Columbian Native American civilization that flourished in settlements along rivers in the northeastern and midwestern Eastern Woodlands from 100 BCE to 500 CE, in the Middle Woodland period. The Hopewell tradition was not a single culture or society, but a widely dispersed set of populations connected by a common network of trade routes. This is known as the Hopewell exchange system. 

There is archaeological evidence for Iroquoian peoples "in the area around present-day New York state by approximately 500 to 600 CE, and possibly as far back as 4000 BCE. Their distinctive culture seems to have developed by about 1000 CE."

Ontario Iroquois tradition

The Ontario Iroquois tradition was conceptualized by the archaeologist J. V. Wright in 1966. It encompasses a group of archaeological cultures considered by archaeologists to be Iroquoian or proto-Iroquoian in character. In the Early Ontario Iroquois stage (likely beginning around AD 900), these comprised the Glen Meyer and Pickering cultures, which clustered in southwestern and eastern Ontario respectively.

During the Middle Ontario Iroquois stage, rapid cultural change took place near the beginning of the 14th century, and detectable differences between the Glen Meyer and Pickering cultures disappeared. The Middle Ontario Iroquois stage is divided into chronological Uren and Middleport substages, which are sometimes termed as cultures. Wright controversially attributed the increase in homogeneity to a "conquest theory", whereby the Pickering culture became dominant over the Glen Meyer and the former became the predecessor of the later Uren and Middleport substages. Archaeologists opposed to Wright's theory have criticized it on a number of levels, such as questioning whether the Glen Meyer and Pickering cultures were meaningfully distinct from each other, reclassifying some Uren and Middleport sites as Glen Meyer, and, by the 1990s, becoming increasingly reluctant to classify sub-groups of sites from the period in Ontario into distinct archaeological cultures at all.

In one 1990 paper, Ronald Williamson stated that Glen Meyer and Pickering cultures might represent "two ends of a continuum of spatial variability extending across southern Ontario," in his arguments against the classification of Ontario Iroquoian sites into groups based on material culture. This dispute paralleled other contemporary discussions over the usefulness of the older system of material culture classification which had mostly been devised in the 1960s and 1970s, such as criticism of the usefulness of the pre-Ontario Iroquoian Saugeen complex as a conceptual model. In a 1995 article, Dean Snow took a more middling view, supporting the idea of Glen Meyer and Pickering cultures being distinct, but also acknowledging that the "conquest theory" was not generally accepted by archaeologists by that point.

The Point Peninsula complex was an indigenous culture located in Ontario and New York from 600 BCE to 700 CE (during the Middle Woodland period). This culture, perhaps in interaction with other complexes eventually developed into the several Iroquoian-speaking nations of Pennsylvania and New York.

Culture 
The Iroquoian peoples had matrilineal kinship systems. They were historically sedentary farmers who lived in large fortified villages enclosed by palisades thirty feet high as a defence against enemy attack, these settlements were referred to as “towns” by early Europeans and supplemented their diet with additional hunting and gathering activities. Longhouses were also common.

References

Citations

Sources

Further reading

 
 
 
 
 
 
 
 
 
 
 
 
 
 
 
 
 
 
 
 
 
 

 
 
Northeastern Woodlands
Northeastern Woodlands
First Nations
Native American tribes
Northeastern Woodlands
Indigenous culture of the Northeastern Woodlands